The following is a list of episodes from the series Cloudy with a Chance of Meatballs.

Series overview

Episodes 
 The two episodes from the first season, "And the Winner Is..." and "Who You Callin’ Garbage?" were directed by Steven Garcia and Jos Humphrey, while the rest of the series was directed by Andrew Duncan and Johnny Darrell.

Season 1 (2017–18)

Season 2 (2018)

Notes

References

Lists of American children's animated television series episodes
Lists of Canadian children's animated television series episodes